Nowosiółki Dydyńskie  is a village in the administrative district of Gmina Fredropol, within Przemyśl County, Subcarpathian Voivodeship, in south-eastern Poland, close to the border with Ukraine.

References

Villages in Przemyśl County